Yann Lachuer (born 5 August 1972) is a French football coach and former professional player who coaches SO Romorantin.

Playing career
Lachuer began his career in the 1992–93 season with US Créteil-Lusitanos in  Ligue 2 the second tier of French Football, making 31 appearances and scoring five goals. His displays brought him to the attention of AJ Auxerre, for whom he signed in 1993. He was limited to just two first team appearances in the following seasons until a loan spell with LB Châteauroux in the 1996–97 season. This was a most productive spell for Lachuer, where he found the net nine times in 32 games. He continued this rich vein of form the next season, following his return to Auxerre, grabbing seven goals in 28 domestic appearances. He played seven times in the UEFA Cup but did not find the target.

1998–99 saw Lachuer move to Paris Saint-Germain, where he endured a rather disappointing season, failing to live up to the standards he had set himself in the previous two years. A solitary goal in 22 games for PSG, was sufficient for them to move him on to another club at the end of the season. A highlight was scoring the winning goal as PSG won the 1998 Trophée des Champions.

For the next two seasons, he plied his trade on the island of Corsica with SC Bastia, scoring seven times in 65 appearances for the club. He returned to AJ Auxerre for a second spell in 2001–02, scoring three goals as Auxerre qualified for the UEFA Champions League. The following season he contributed four goals as Auxerre won the Coupe de France, their first major honour since completing the League and Cup double in 1995–96.

Winning the Coupe de France ensured Auxerre qualified for the UEFA Cup where Lachuer scored his first goal in European competition, to go alongside the three league goals he amassed as Auxerre finished 4th in  Ligue 1. In doing so they managed to qualify for the UEFA Cup for the second successive season. In the 2004–05 season he scored only his second-ever European goal, again in the UEFA Cup. He also notched up 24 club appearances as Auxerre won the Coupe de France for the second time in three seasons.

2005–06 proved to be Lachuer's last season with Auxerre. He managed four goals in 27 appearances for the club. Lachuer opted not to renew his contract with Auxerre after it expired, preferring instead to pursue his career elsewhere. After considering offers from AS Nancy, OGC Nice, Le Mans UC72, AS Saint-Étienne and clubs in  Italy and the United Arab Emirates, he opted to sign a one-year deal with Troyes.

He outlined his reasons for opting for Troyes in several interviews, stating that he was attracted by their style of play. After a one-year contract with Troyes where he led Ligue 1 with 10 assists he signed a contract with L2 team, LB Châteauroux.

Lachuer remains a popular figure in French football and is widely regarded by many fans, as one of the best players never to appear for Les Bleus.

Coaching career
In November 2018, he became the head coach of Romorantin.

Personal life
Lachuer is the brother of Julien Lachuer, and the uncle of Mathis Lachuer, both professional footballers.

Honours
Auxerre
Division 1: 1995–96
Coupe de France: 1995–96, 2002-03, 2004-05

References

External links

 

1972 births
Living people
People from Champigny-sur-Marne
Footballers from Val-de-Marne
Lachuer Yann
Association football midfielders
US Créteil-Lusitanos players
AJ Auxerre players
LB Châteauroux players
Paris Saint-Germain F.C. players
SC Bastia players
ES Troyes AC players
US Orléans players
Ligue 1 players
Ligue 2 players
French football managers
US Orléans managers
US Créteil-Lusitanos managers
French people of Breton descent
Brittany international footballers